Armando da Silva Marques, CvIH (born 1 May 1937) is a Portuguese sports shooter. He competed at the 1964, 1972 and 1976 Summer Olympics. In the mixed trap event at the 1976 Olympics, he won a silver medal.

References

External links
 

1937 births
Living people
Portuguese male sport shooters
Olympic shooters of Portugal
Shooters at the 1964 Summer Olympics
Shooters at the 1972 Summer Olympics
Shooters at the 1976 Summer Olympics
Olympic silver medalists for Portugal
Olympic medalists in shooting
Medalists at the 1976 Summer Olympics
Sportspeople from Lisbon